The 2008–09 Texas Longhorns men's basketball team represented The University of Texas at Austin in NCAA Division I intercollegiate men's basketball competition as a member of the Big 12 Conference. The 2008–09 team posted a 23–12 record, finished in fourth place in the Big 12, and reached the second round of the 2009 NCAA tournament.

Roster

Recruiting

Schedule 

|-
!colspan=12 style=| Regular season

|-
!colspan=12 style=|Big 12 Tournament

|-
!colspan=12 style=|NCAA tournament

Rankings

Awards and honors
 Rick Barnes, Legends of Coaching Award (adopted by the John R.Wooden Award Committee)

References 

Texas Longhorns men's basketball seasons
Texas
Texas
2008 in sports in Texas
2009 in sports in Texas